Bicaj is a village and a former municipality in Kukës County, Albania. At the 2015 local government reform it became a subdivision of the municipality Kukës. The population at the 2011 census was 5,631. The municipal unit consists of the following villages:

Bushat 
Bicaj 
Osmane
Muholë
Mustafë
Nangë
Kolesian
Domaj
Gabricë
Tërshen

References

Former municipalities in Kukës County
Administrative units of Kukës
Villages in Kukës County